Cyperus anderssonii, commonly known as Andersson's sedge, is a species of sedge that is endemic to the Galapagos Islands.

The species was first formally described by the botanist Johann Otto Boeckeler in 1870.

See also
List of Cyperus species

References

anderssonii
Taxa named by Johann Otto Boeckeler
Plants described in 1870